Lullaby is the 41st novel featuring Robert B. Parker's fictional detective Spenser. It is the first official Spenser novel not written by Parker, but by Ace Atkins. Atkins was asked to write the novel after Parker's death in 2010.

Plot
Mattie Sullivan, a fourteen-year-old girl, recruits Spenser to solve her mother's murder four years earlier. The man convicted of her murder, Mickey Green, was a friend of Mattie's mother and Mattie believes he was framed. When an old mob figure named Jumpin' Jack Flynn appears to be involved (along with Spenser's longtime enemies the Broz family), Spenser calls in Hawk and Vinnie Morris for back up.

Recurring characters
Spenser
Hawk
Dr. Susan Silverman, Ph.D
Cpt. Martin Quirk, Boston Police Department
Sgt. Frank Belson, Boston Police Department
Vinnie Morris
Gerry Broz
Joe Broz

Reception
Reviews for the first of Atkins' novels featuring Spenser were overwhelmingly positive. Most reviewers felt Atkins successfully imitated Parker's voice, pacing and the character's banter. They also praised the complexity of the plot.

References

External links
 Page on the book from Parker's official website

2012 American novels
Spenser (novel series)
Novels about American prostitution
G. P. Putnam's Sons books